The electoral district of Niddrie is a metropolitan electorate approximately  northwest of Melbourne, Australia in Victoria's Legislative Assembly.

The district boundaries include Sharps Road for part of the north, Tullamarine Freeway and Roberts Street for parts of the east, Maribyrnong River in the south, and Sunshine Avenue for part of the west.

It is part of the Upper House Western Metropolitan Region.

Members for Niddrie

Election results

References

External links
 Electorate profile: Niddrie District, Victorian Electoral Commission

1976 establishments in Australia
Electoral districts of Victoria (Australia)
City of Moonee Valley
City of Brimbank
Electoral districts and divisions of Greater Melbourne